The 66th Filmfare Awards ceremony, presented by The Times Group, honored the best Indian Hindi-language films of 2020.

Ludo led the ceremony with 16 nominations each, followed by Thappad with 15 nominations, and Gulabo Sitabo and Tanhaji with 13 nominations each.

Thappad won 7 awards, including Best Film and Best Actress (for Taapsee Pannu), thus becoming the most-awarded film at the ceremony.

Pankaj Tripathi received dual nominations for Best Supporting Actor for his performances in Gunjan Saxena: The Kargil Girl and Ludo, but lost to Saif Ali Khan who the award for Tanhaji.

At age 88, Farrukh Jaffar set a record for becoming the oldest winner of an acting Filmfare Award, winning Best Supporting Actress for her performance in Gulabo Sitabo.

Winners and nominees
On 27 March 2021, winners were announced. Below is the list of winners:

Popular awards

Critics' Awards

Special Awards

Technical awards
Nominations for the Technical awards were announced on the same day.

Short Film Awards

Superlatives

See also
 Filmfare Awards
 List of Bollywood films of 2020

References

External links
 Filmfare Official Website
 Filmfare Awards 2021

Filmfare Awards
2021 Indian film awards